Madison County is a county located in the Commonwealth of Virginia. As of the 2020 census, the population was 13,837. Its county seat is Madison.

History 
Madison County was established in December 1792, created from Culpeper County. The county is named for the Madison family that owned land along the Rapidan River. President James Madison is a descendant of that family.

Geography

A significant portion of western Madison County is within Shenandoah National Park, including Hawksbill Mountain, the highest point in both the park and in Madison County, Old Rag Mountain, one of the park's most popular tourist destinations, and Rapidan Camp, the presidential retreat built by Herbert Hoover. Hoover's Camp was built between 1929 and 1932. The camp consisted of 13 buildings with the main one being "The Brown House". In 2017, only three of these houses are still standing (The Brown House, The Prime Minister Cabin, and The Creel). The camp was built where two streams merge to form the Rapidan River because fishing was Hoover's favorite pastime. Hoover even made sure that the camp was built at an elevation where mosquitos would not be a nuisance while fishing. The camp was donated to the Commonwealth of Virginia in 1932 so other presidents could use it and in December 1935 it officially became a part of Shenandoah National Park.

Adjacent counties
 Page County, Virginia – northwest
 Rappahannock County, Virginia – north
 Culpeper County, Virginia – east
 Orange County, Virginia – southeast
 Greene County, Virginia – southwest

National protected area
 Shenandoah National Park (part)

Major highways

Demographics

2020 census

Note: the US Census treats Hispanic/Latino as an ethnic category. This table excludes Latinos from the racial categories and assigns them to a separate category. Hispanics/Latinos can be of any race.

2000 Census
As of the census of 2000, there were 12,520 people, 4,739 households, and 3,521 families residing in the county.  The population density was 39 people per square mile (15/km2).  There were 5,239 housing units at an average density of 16 per square mile (6/km2).  The racial makeup of the county was 86.71% White, 11.41% Black or African American, 0.14% Native American, 0.50% Asian, 0.02% Pacific Islander, 0.29% from other races, and 0.93% from two or more races.  0.77% of the population were Hispanic or Latino of any race.

There were 4,739 households, out of which 30.90% had children under the age of 18 living with them, 61.40% were married couples living together, 8.80% had a female householder with no husband present, and 25.70% were non-families. 21.80% of all households were made up of individuals, and 9.50% had someone living alone who was 65 years of age or older.  The average household size was 2.60 and the average family size was 3.03.

In the county, the population was spread out, with 24.10% under the age of 18, 6.90% from 18 to 24, 27.60% from 25 to 44, 26.40% from 45 to 64, and 15.00% who were 65 years of age or older.  The median age was 40 years. For every 100 females there were 95.00 males.  For every 100 females age 18 and over, there were 94.60 males.

The median income for a household in the county was $39,856, and the median income for a family was $44,857. Males had a median income of $30,805 versus $24,384 for females. The per capita income for the county was $18,636.  About 6.90% of families and 9.60% of the population were below the poverty line, including 12.70% of those under age 18 and 10.20% of those age 65 or over.

Communities

Towns
 Madison

Census-designated place
 Brightwood

Other unincorporated communities

 Aroda
 Aylor
 Banco
 Beaver Park
 Big Meadows
 Burnt Tree
 Criglersville
 Decapolis
 Duet
 Elly
 Etlan
 Five Forks
 Fletcher
 Fordsville
 Graves Mill
 Haywood
 Hood
 Kinderhook
 Leon
 Locust Dale
 Madison Mills
 Nethers
 Novum
 O'Neal
 Oakpark
 Oldrag
 Pratts
 Radiant
 Repton Mills
 Rochelle
 Ruth
 Shelby
 Syria
 Tanners
 Tryme
 Twyman's Mill
 Uno
 Waylandsburg
 Wolftown
 Zeus

Politics
Madison County is a Republican stronghold and has not voted for a Democratic presidential nominee since 1940.

Education
Madison County Public Schools has around 2000 students in four schools. Madison Primary School has grades K–2 and has around 370 students. Waverly Yowell Elementary School has grades 3–5 and around 410 students. William Wetsel Middle School has grades 6–8 and around 415 students. Madison County High School has grades 9–12 and has around 665 students. All statistics based on 2007–2008 VA DOE statistics. It is also home to Woodberry Forest School, a private, all-male boarding school.

Censorship 
In January 2023, the Madison County School Board banned 21 books from the high school library, including books by Stephen King, Toni Morrison, and Christian writer Anne Rice.

Madison County High School 
Madison County High School is the county's only High School. Grades 9–12 attend MCHS.  The total number of students at MCHS was 584 for 2013–2014. Madison County's nickname is the Mountaineers and have two main logos. One is an inked drawing of a Mountaineer standing on a mountain. In the background, a caravan of people and covered wagons can be seen being led by the Mountaineer. The second main logo is a "M" with a "C" offset and connected to it standing for Madison County, the name of both the county and high school. The colors are blue and white. MCHS fields athletic teams in football, basketball, soccer, volleyball, wrestling, track, cross country, golf, baseball and softball. Swimming was added as a sport in 2011. Cheerleading teams are also fielded for football and basketball games. Madison is home to the 2012 Group A, Division 1 state champions in Forensics.

MCHS offers AP courses and dual enrollment courses through Germanna Community College. MCHS has full accreditation from the Virginia Department of Education with Virginia Standards of Learning passing rates ranging from 94 percent on the history to 86 percent on the science. MCHS graduates more than 90% of its students per year.

William H. Wetsel Middle School
William H. Wetsel Middle School was opened in August, 1993 under the leadership of Principal, John Anderson.  Grades 6 and 7 were moved from Waverly Yowell Elementary School and Grade 8 was removed from Madison County High School to form a Grades 6-8 middle school.  William Wetsel, the school's namesake, was a former agriculture teacher and superintendent in Madison County.

See also
 National Register of Historic Places listings in Madison County, Virginia

References

External links
 Official Madison County Website
 Official Madison County Map
 Madison County Historical Society
 Madison County Chamber of Commerce

 
1792 establishments in Virginia
Northern Virginia counties
Populated places established in 1792
Virginia counties